Portland is an unincorporated community in southeastern Callaway County, Missouri, United States. It is part of the Jefferson City, Missouri Metropolitan Statistical Area. Portland is located just north of the Missouri River on Route 94, approximately 24 miles east-northeast of Jefferson City.

History
The village was laid out in 1831. Its location directly on the Missouri River made it a popular shipping point for the farms and plantations of Callaway County. The name Portland stems from that activity.

References

Unincorporated communities in Callaway County, Missouri
Jefferson City metropolitan area
Unincorporated communities in Missouri